Four Crosses is a village in Montgomeryshire in northern Powys, mid Wales, close to the border with Shropshire. It is in the community of Llandysilio.

Geography
The village sits on the Offa's Dyke Path. The nearest town is Oswestry.

Population
It is home to over 900 persons.

Historic businesses
Historically, the village was a centre for milk collection. The Four Crosses Creamery produced prize winning ice cream which was distributed over a large area of mid/north Wales and adjoining counties.

Transport
The village was served by Four Crosses railway station until 1965. It lies on the A483 road which now bypasses the village to the west.

Sport
The Foxen Manor housing estate has a football field and playground. This field is home to Four Crosses who play in the FAW League One, the third tier of Welsh football. The village was the home of Rodney Rovers Football Club (played behind the Golden Lion public house) which played at a high level.

Former British Light heavyweight Boxing Champion Dennis Powell lived in the village. A plaque is affixed to his training "hall".

The village was a stopping point (Bowyers Garage) on route to the Monte Carlo Rally.

External links 
Photos of Four Crosses and surrounding area on geograph

Villages in Powys